The Riley 12/6 was a car made by the British Riley company from late 1932 (for the 1933 model year) to 1935. 

It had a 1458 cc straight-six engine with twin cams and either single, twin or triple S.U carburettors. The transmission was either a four speed manual or optional preselector gearbox. The chassis was a lengthened version of the one used on the Riley Nine.

They were available in Mentone saloon, Kestrel saloon, Lincock fixed head coupé, Ascot drophead coupé with dickey seat, Lynx tourer, Falcon saloon, Gamecock tourer and March two seat tourer, MPH two seater trial/sports 2-seater and Trinity 3-position-Drophead-Coupé.

The 12/6 engine was designed to fit in between the 9 and 14/6 engines for trialing and racing purposes. The 9 was 1087 cc, fitting in the 1100 cc class, and the 14/6 was 1633 cc, fitting in the over 1500 cc class. A 1486 cc "Brooklands Six" was developed to compete in the sub-1500 cc International Class F, with two or three cars built in mid-1932. Another such engine was fitted to an Alpine Tourer for the 1932 Monte Carlo Rally, where it finished second in class. The 1458 cc 12/6 was derived from the Brooklands Six. The slightly larger "Brooklands" engine continued to see some limited use, such as in the 1933 Riley Grebe prototype and in the TT Six.

As the 14/6 was basically a 9 with two extra cylinders on the end, the 9 and 14/6 engines shared the same parts and spares. The 12/6 didn't share parts with any other Riley, so many 12/6s have been bored out to the size of a 14/6 to compensate for spares. All of these engines share the same  stroke. The 12/6 has a  bore, while the "Brooklands" competition engine has a  mm bore.

Gallery

References

12 6
Cars introduced in 1932